Raphitoma dempsta is a species of sea snail, a marine gastropod mollusk in the family Raphitomidae.

Description
The length of the shell reaches 3 mm, its diameter 1 mm.

The white, minute, short shell has a rhomboid-fusiform shape and contains six whorls. The shell shows eight conspicuous ribs and dense, spiral threads. The body whorl measures half the total length. The aperture is long and narrow. The outer lip is sharp and incrassate posteriorly. The short siphonal canal is wide.

Distribution
This marine species occurs in the South China Seas.

References

External links
 G.W. Tryon (1884) Manual of Conchology, structural and systematic, with illustrations of the species, vol. VI; Philadelphia, Academy of Natural Sciences 
  R.I. Johnson, The Recent Mollusca of Augustus Addison Gould; United States National Museum, bulletin 239, Washington D.C. 1964
  Tucker, J.K. 2004 Catalog of recent and fossil turrids (Mollusca: Gastropoda). Zootaxa 682:1–1295.

dempsta
Gastropods described in 1860